This page is about theatre in Maryland.

List of theatres in Maryland.

Professional Theatres
 Baltimore Theatre Project
 Centerstage
 Chesapeake Shakespeare Company
 Columbia Center for Theatrical Arts
 Cumberland Theatre
 Everyman Theatre
 Hippodrome Theatre
 Maryland Ensemble Theatre
 Maryland Shakespeare Festival
 Olney Theatre Center
 Performance Workshop Theatre
 Perisphere Theater
 Red Branch Theatre Company
 Rep Stage
 Round House Theatre
 Single Carrot Theatre
 Toby's Dinner Theatre

Fringe Theatres
 Baltimore Rock Opera Society
 Baltimore Shakespeare Factory
 Iron Crow Theatre
 The Rude Mechanicals
 The Strand Theater
 Submersive Productions
 Venus Theatre

Community Theatres
 Annapolis Summer Garden Theatre
 The Arena Players
 Artistic Synergy of Baltimore
 Bowie Community Theater
 Colonial Players
 Dundalk Community Theater
 Fells Point Corner Theatre
 Hard Bargain Players
 Laurel Mill Playhouse
 Liberty Showcase Theater
 Milburn Stone Theatre
 Mobtown Players
 New Direction Community Theater
 The Newtowne Players
 Patuxent Playhouse
 Port Tobacco Players
 Potomac Playmakers
 Rockville Little Theater
 September Song Musical Theatre
 Silhouette Stages
 Silver Spring Stage
 Spotlighters Theatre
 Tantallon Players, Fort Washington
 Theatre on The Hill
 Twin Beaches Players, Chesapeake Beach
 Vagabond Players
 Winters Lane Productions
 Way Off Broadway Dinner Theatre & Children's Theatre

Children's Theatre & Youth Theatres
 Adventure Theatre
 Children's Playhouse of Maryland
 Children's Theater Association
 Drama Learning Center 
 Imagination Stage
 Pumpkin Theatre
 The Sky Is The Limit Productions
 Children’s Theatre of Annapolis 
 Talent Machine

Collegiate Educational Theatre 
 University of Maryland College Park
 University of Maryland Baltimore County
 Bowie State University
 Loyola College
 Salisbury University
 Towson University
 Goucher College
 St. Mary's College
 Frostburg State University
 Maryland Institute College of Art
 Morgan State University (Theatre Morgan)

Awards 
 Helen Hayes Awards
 Greater Baltimore Theater Awards
 The Cappies in Baltimore, Maryland

References 

Regional theatre in the United States

Maryland
Theaters